The Texas Rangers 2008 season was the 48th year of the franchise and 37th since moving to Arlington, Texas. The organization, after finishing fourth in the American League Western Division in 2007. The new season would be the first under the oversight of newly hired club president and former Ranger great Nolan Ryan. Upon his hire, Ryan indicated that his role in the 2008 season would be largely observational with regard to baseball operations, and any major changes would be made following the conclusion of the regular season.

The Rangers set a Major League record for the most doubles by a team in a season, with 376.

Preseason

Notable offseason transactions
The Rangers' offseason was filled with activity as Jon Daniels moved to quickly acquire talent both on and off the field. The 2007 club roster fielded several arbitration-eligible players, whose status for 2008 remained unsure. Several of these players would sign short-term contracts with the Rangers while others would seek playing time elsewhere.

2007
OFs Sammy Sosa, Brad Wilkerson, and IF Jerry Hairston Jr. signed with other clubs in the offseason.
Hitting coach Rudy Jaramillo signed a new 2-year contract with the Rangers; RHPs Frank Francisco and Joaquín Benoit also signed 1- and 2-year extensions with the club.
RHP Warner Madrigal signed as a minor league free agent after the Los Angeles Angels failed to add him to the team's 40-man roster before free agency began.
December 8: OF Milton Bradley signed a 1-year contract for $5 million.
December 21: OF Josh Hamilton acquired from the Cincinnati Reds for RHP Edinson Vólquez and RHP Danny Herrera.
December 29: 1B Chris Shelton acquired from the Detroit Tigers in exchange for minor league OF Freddy Guzman.

January 2008
January 5: 1B Ben Broussard acquired via trade from the Seattle Mariners for minor leaguer Tug Hulett and signed to a 1-year contract worth $3.85 million, avoiding salary arbitration.
January 11–18: LHP Eddie Guardado ($2 million), RHP Jason Jennings ($4m), C Gerald Laird ($6m), and OF Marlon Byrd ($1.8m) all signed 1-year contracts with the Rangers.
January 14: RHP Kazuo Fukumori agreed to a 2-year contract worth $3 million.
January 25: RHP Armando Galarraga designated for assignment and traded to the Tigers in exchange for minor league OF Michael Hernandez.

February and March

February 19: 2B Ian Kinsler signed a 5-year extension for $22 million, keeping him with the Rangers through 2012.
February 25: The Rangers agreed to terms with 7 players: OF David Murphy, 3B Travis Metcalf, RHPs Brandon McCarthy and Wes Littleton, and LHP A. J. Murray. The other two, RHPs Alexi Ogando and Omar Beltré  remained on the restricted list until their legal issues were resolved prior to the 2010 season.
February 28: General Manager Jon Daniels and Rangers President Nolan Ryan signed contracts through the 2011 season.
March 25: OF Nelson Cruz designated for assignment, cleared waivers, and later assigned to the minor leagues.

Regular season

Opening Day starters
Gerald Laird, C
Ben Broussard, 1B
Ian Kinsler, 2B
Hank Blalock, 3B
Michael Young, SS
David Murphy, LF
Josh Hamilton, CF
Marlon Byrd, RF
Milton Bradley, DH
Kevin Millwood, RHP

Season standings

Sjjhsakjljdlk

Record vs. Opponents

Game log

|- align="center" bgcolor="ffbbbb"
| 1 || March 31 || @ Mariners || 5–2 || Green (1–0) || Millwood (0–1) || Putz (1) || 46,334 || 0–1
|-

|- align="center" bgcolor="bbffbb"
| 2 || April 1 || @ Mariners || 5–4 || Benoit (1–0) || Putz (0–1) || Wilson (1) || 25,204 || 1–1
|- align="center" bgcolor="ffbbbb"
| 3 || April 2 || @ Mariners || 4–1 || Silva (1–0) || Jennings (0–1) || Batista (1) || 21,349 || 1–2
|- align="center" bgcolor="bbffbb"
| 4 || April 4 || @ Angels || 11–6 || Gabbard (1–0) || Moseley (0–1) || || 43,838 || 2–2
|- align="center" bgcolor="ffbbbb"
| 5 || April 5 || @ Angels || 2–1 || Weaver (1–1) || Millwood (0–2) || Rodríguez (3) || 41,170 || 2–3
|- align="center" bgcolor="bbffbb"
| 6 || April 6 || @ Angels || 10–4 || Padilla (1–0) || Garland (1–1) || || 39,242 || 3–3
|- align="center" bgcolor="ffbbbb"
| 7 || April 8 || Orioles || 8–1 || Burres (1–0) || Jennings (0–2) || || 48,808 || 3–4
|- align="center" bgcolor="bbbbbb"
| – || April 9 || Orioles || colspan=6|Postponed (rain) Made up as a doubleheader April 10
|- align="center" bgcolor="bbffbb"
| 8 || April 10 || Orioles ||  3–1 || Millwood (1–2) || Trachsel (1–1) || Wilson (2) || || 4–4
|- align="center" bgcolor="bbffbb"
| 9 || April 10 || Orioles || 5–4 || Wright (1–0) || Bradford (0–1) || Wilson (3) || 15,560 || 5–4
|- align="center" bgcolor="ffbbbb"
| 10 || April 11 || Blue Jays || 8–5 || Litsch (2–0) || Padilla (1–1) || Downs (1) || 24,209 || 5–5
|- align="center" bgcolor="ffbbbb"
| 11 || April 12 || Blue Jays || 4–1 || Halladay (2–1) || Mendoza (0–1) || || 34,960  || 5–6
|- align="center" bgcolor="ffbbbb"
| 12 || April 13 || Blue Jays || 5 – 4 (10) || Carlson (1–0) || Nippert (0–1) || Ryan (1) || 21,515 || 5–7
|- align="center" bgcolor="ffbbbb"
| 13 || April 14 || Angels || 7–4 || Santana (2–0) || Jennings (0–3) || Rodríguez (4) || 16,541 || 5–8
|- align="center" bgcolor="ffbbbb"
| 14 || April 15 || Angels || 7–4 || Oliver (1–0) || Rupe (0–1) || Rodríguez (5) || 15,595 || 5–9
|- align="center" bgcolor="bbffbb"
| 15 || April 16 || @ Blue Jays || 7 – 5 (14) || Nippert (1–1) || Burnett (1–1) || Wilson (4) || 15,686 || 6–9
|- align="center" bgcolor="bbffbb"
| 16 || April 17 || @ Blue Jays || 4–1 || Padilla (2–1) || Halladay (2–2) || Wilson (5) || 15,809 || 7–9
|- align="center" bgcolor="ffbbbb"
| 17 || April 18 || @ Red Sox || 11–3 || Matsuzaka (4–0) || Mendoza (0–2) || || 37,902 || 7–10
|- align="center" bgcolor="ffbbbb"
| 18 || April 19 || @ Red Sox || 5–3 || López (1–0) || Benoit (1–1) || Papelbon (6) || 37,958 || 7–11
|- align="center" bgcolor="ffbbbb"
| 19 || April 20 || @ Red Sox || 6–5 || Wakefield (2–0) || Wilson (0–1) || Papelbon (7) || 37,480 || 7–12
|- align="center" bgcolor="ffbbbb"
| 20 || April 21 || @ Red Sox || 8–3 || Buchholz (1–1) || Nippert (1–2) || || 37,539 || 7–13
|- align="center" bgcolor="ffbbbb"
| 21 || April 22 || @ Tigers || 10–2 || Verlander (1–3) || Padilla (2–2) || || 33,629 || 7–14
|- align="center" bgcolor="ffbbbb"
| 22 || April 23 || @ Tigers || 19–6 || Rapada (2–0) || Francisco (0–1) || || 34,245 || 7–15
|- align="center" bgcolor="ffbbbb"
| 23 || April 24 || @ Tigers || 8–2 || Miner (1–1) || Jennings (0–4) || || 39,058 || 7–16
|- align="center" bgcolor="bbffbb"
| 24 || April 25 || Twins || 6–5 || Benoit (2–1) || Rincón (2–1) || || 19,016 || 8–16
|- align="center" bgcolor="ffbbbb"
| 25 || April 26 || Twins || 12–6 || Reyes (1–0) || Wright (1–1) || || 33,053 || 8–17
|- align="center" bgcolor="bbffbb"
| 26 || April 27 || Twins || 10–0 || Padilla (3–2) || Hernández (3–1) || || 19,911 || 9–17
|- align="center" bgcolor="ffbbbb"
| 27 || April 29 || Royals || 9–5 || Mahay (1–0) || Jennings (0–5) || || 16,472 || 9–18
|- align="center" bgcolor="bbffbb"
| 28 || April 30 || Royals || 11–9 || Millwood (2–2) || Bannister (3–2) || || 17,705 || 10–18
|-

|- align="center" bgcolor="bbffbb"
| 29 || May 1 || Royals || 2–1 || Ponson (1–0) || Greinke (3–1) || Wilson (6) || 14,563 || 11–18
|- align="center" bgcolor="bbffbb"
| 30 || May 2 || @ Athletics || 4–3 || Padilla (4–2) || Blanton (2–5) || Wilson (7) || 15,408 || 12–18
|- align="center" bgcolor="bbffbb"
| 31 || May 3 || @ Athletics || 6–3 || Murray (1–0) || Gaudin (3–2) || Benoit (1) || 20,524 || 13–18
|- align="center" bgcolor="ffbbbb"
| 32 || May 4 || @ Athletics || 3–1 || Casilla (1–0) || Feldman (0–1) || Street (9) || 31,673 || 13–19
|- align="center" bgcolor="ffbbbb"
| 33 || May 5 || @ Mariners || 7–3 || Washburn (2–4) || Millwood (2–3) || || 16,637 || 13–20
|- align="center" bgcolor="bbffbb"
| 34 || May 6 || @ Mariners || 10–1 || Ponson (2–0) || Batista (2–4) || || 15,818 || 14–20
|- align="center" bgcolor="bbffbb"
| 35 || May 7 || @ Mariners || 2–0 || Padilla (5–2) || Bedard (2–2) || Wilson (8) || 17,173 || 15–20
|- align="center" bgcolor="bbffbb"
| 36 || May 8 || @ Mariners || 5–0 || Germán (1–0) || Hernández (2–3) || || 22,922 || 16–20
|- align="center" bgcolor="bbffbb"
| 37 || May 9 || Athletics || 4–0 || Feldman (1–1) || Smith (2–2) || || 23,516 || 17–20
|- align="center" bgcolor="bbffbb"
| 38 || May 10 || Athletics || 6–4 || Rupe (1–1) || Eveland (3–3) || || 22,899 || 18–20
|- align="center" bgcolor="ffbbbb"
| 39 || May 11 || Athletics || 12–6 || Casilla (2–0) || Germán (1–1) || || 23,959 ||18–21
|- align="center" bgcolor="bbffbb"
| 40 || May 12 || Mariners || 13 – 12 (10) || Mathis (1–0) || Morrow (0–1) || || 18,509 || 19–21
|- align="center" bgcolor="bbffbb"
| 41 || May 13 || Mariners || 5–2 || Rupe (2–1) || Hernández (2–4) || Guardado (1) || 15,766 || 20–21
|- align="center" bgcolor="ffbbbb"
| 42 || May 14 || Mariners || 4 – 3 (12) || Putz (1–1) || Germán (1–2) || Washburn (1) || 22,934 || 20–22
|- align="center" bgcolor="bbffbb"
| 43 || May 16 || Astros || 16–8 || Wright (2–1) || Wright (3–1) || || 32,117 || 21–22
|- align="center" bgcolor="bbffbb"
| 44 || May 17 || Astros || 6–2 || Padilla (6–2) || Oswalt (4–4) || || 38,534 || 22–22
|- align="center" bgcolor="ffbbbb"
| 45 || May 18 || Astros || 5–4 || Backe (2–5) || Gabbard (1–1) || Valverde (11) || 33,561 || 22–23
|- align="center" bgcolor="ffbbbb"
| 46 || May 19 || @ Twins || 7 – 6 (12) || Korecky (1–0) || Germán (1–3) ||  || 16,680 || 22–24
|- align="center" bgcolor="ffbbbb"
| 47 || May 20 || @ Twins || 11–4 || Perkins (1–1) || Mathis (1–1)  || || 19,376  || 22–25
|- align="center" bgcolor="bbffbb"
| 48 || May 21 || @ Twins || 10–1 || Ponson (3–0) || Blackburn (4–3) || || 22,032 || 23–25
|- align="center" bgcolor="bbffbb"
| 49 || May 22 || @ Twins || 8 – 7 (10) || Benoit (2–1) || Bass (1–1) || Wilson (9) || 23,126 || 24–25
|- align="center" bgcolor="bbffbb"
| 50 || May 23 || @ Indians || 13–9 || Loe (1–0) || Carmona (4–2) || || 39,947 || 25–25
|- align="center" bgcolor="ffbbbb"
| 51 || May 24 || @ Indians || 5–2 || Lee (7–1) || Feldman (1–2) || Borowski (3) || 40,504 || 25–26
|- align="center" bgcolor="bbffbb"
| 52 || May 25 || @ Indians || 2 – 1 (10) || Wright (3–1) || Kobayashi (2–2) || Wilson (10) || 35,464 || 26–26
|- align="center" bgcolor="ffbbbb"
| 53 || May 26 || @ Rays || 7–3 || Kazmir (4–1) || Ponson (3–1) || || 12,174 || 26–27
|- align="center" bgcolor="bbffbb"
| 54 || May 27 || @ Rays || 12–6 || Padilla (7–2) || Sonnanstine (6–3) || || 10,511 || 27–27
|- align="center" bgcolor="ffbbbb"
| 55 || May 28 || @ Rays || 5–3 || Garza (4–1) || Gabbard (1–2) || Wheeler (1) || 10,927 || 27–28
|- align="center" bgcolor="bbffbb"
| 56 || May 30 || Athletics || 3–1 || Millwood (3–3) || Duchscherer (4–4) || Wilson (11) || 21,763 || 28–28
|- align="center" bgcolor="bbffbb"
| 57 || May 31 || Athletics || 8–4 || Ponson (4–1) || Blanton (3–7) || || 36,798 || 29–28
|-

|- align="center" bgcolor="ffbbbb"
| 58 || June 1 || Athletics || 13–8 || Gaudin (3–3) || Wright (3–2) || || 17,661 || 29–29
|- align="center" bgcolor="ffbbbb"
| 59 || June 2 || Indians || 13–9 || Kobayashi (3–2) || Guardado (0–1) || || 17,247 || 29–30
|- align="center" bgcolor="bbffbb"
| 60 || June 3 || Indians || 12–7 || Francisco (1–1) || Mastny (0–1) || || 16,373 || 30–30
|- align="center" bgcolor="ffbbbb"
| 61 || June 4 || Indians || 15–9 || Lee (9–1) || Ramírez (0–1) || || 19,676 || 30–31
|- align="center" bgcolor="bbffbb"
| 62 || June 5 || Indians || 9–4 || Millwood (4–3) || Sabathia (3–8) || || 17,795 || 31–31
|- align="center" bgcolor="ffbbbb"
| 63 || June 6 || Rays || 12–4 || Kazmir (6–1) || Padilla (7–3) || || 21,783 || 31–32
|- align="center" bgcolor="ffbbbb"
| 64 || June 7 || Rays || 5–4 || Howell (5–0) || Benoit (3–2) || Wheeler (2) || 28,788 || 31–33
|- align="center" bgcolor="bbffbb"
| 65 || June 8 || Rays || 6–3 || Mathis (2–1) || Garza (4–3) ||  || 20,258 || 32–33
|- align="center" bgcolor="bbffbb"
| 66 || June 10 || @ Royals || 6–5 || Guardado (1–1) || Yabuta (1–1) || Wilson (12) || 14,741 || 33–33
|- align="center" bgcolor="bbffbb"
| 67 || June 11 || @ Royals || 11–5 || Padilla (8–3) || Gobble (0–2) || || 20,840 || 34–33
|- align="center" bgcolor="ffbbbb"
| 68 || June 12 || @ Royals || 6–5 || Mahay (2–0) || Francisco (1–2) || Soria (15) || 15,515 || 34–34
|- align="center" bgcolor="ffbbbb"
| 69 || June 13 || @ Mets || 7–1 || Pérez (5–4) || Feldman (1–3) || || 49,880 || 34–35
|- align="center" bgcolor="bbbbbb"
| – || June 14 || @ Mets || colspan=6|Postponed (rain) Made up as a doubleheader June 15
|- align="center" bgcolor="bbffbb"
| 70 || June 15 || @ Mets || 8–7 || Millwood (5–3) || Maine (6–5) || Wilson (13) ||  || 35–35
|- align="center" bgcolor="ffbbbb"
| 71 || June 15 || @ Mets || 4–2 || Martínez (2–0) || Gabbard (1–3) || Wagner (14) || 55,438 || 35–36
|- align="center" bgcolor="bbffbb"
| 72 || June 17 || Braves || 7–5 || Padilla (9–3) || Hudson (7–5) || Wilson (14) || 33,558 || 36–36
|- align="center" bgcolor="ffbbbb"
| 73 || June 18 || Braves || 5–2 || Bennett (1–4) || Wilson (0–2) || González (1) || 38,545 || 36–37
|- align="center" bgcolor="bbffbb"
| 74 || June 19 || Braves || 5–4 || Wright (4–2) || Boyer (1–5) || || 28,853 || 37–37
|- align="center" bgcolor="ffbbbb"
| 75 || June 20 || @ Nationals ||  4 – 3 (14) || Hanrahan (3–2) || Wright (4–3) || || 30,359 || 37–38
|- align="center" bgcolor="bbffbb"
| 76 || June 21 || @ Nationals || 13–3 || Gabbard (2–3) || Mock (0–2) || Mendoza (1) || 32,975 || 38–38
|- align="center" bgcolor="bbffbb"
| 77 || June 22 || @ Nationals || 5–3 || Padilla (10–3) || Ayala (1–4) || Wilson (15) || 32,690 || 39–38
|- align="center" bgcolor="ffbbbb"
| 78 || June 24 || @ Astros || 4–3 || Moehler (4–3) || Hurley (0–1) || Valverde (19) || 40,052 || 39–39
|- align="center" bgcolor="bbffbb"
| 79 || June 25 || @ Astros || 3–2 || Mendoza (1–2) || Oswalt (6–8) || Wilson (16) || 32,567 || 40–39
|- align="center" bgcolor="ffbbbb"
| 80 || June 26 || @ Astros || 7–2 || Rodríguez (3–3) || Millwood (5–4) || || 36,506 || 40–40
|- align="center" bgcolor="bbffbb"
| 81 || June 27 || Phillies || 8–7 || Rupe (3–1) || Condrey (1–1) || Wilson (17) || 28,623 || 41–40
|- align="center" bgcolor="ffbbbb"
| 82 || June 28 || Phillies || 8–6 || Hamels (8–5) || Padilla (10–4) || Lidge (19) || 28,623 || 41–41
|- align="center" bgcolor="bbffbb"
| 83 || June 29 || Phillies || 5–1 || Hurley (1–1) || Moyer (7–6) || || 26,283 || 42–41
|- align="center" bgcolor="bbffbb"
| 84 || June 30 || @ Yankees || 2–1 || Feldman (2–3) || Mussina (10–6) || Wilson (18) || 53,045 || 43–41
|-

|- align="center" bgcolor="bbffbb"
| 85 || July 1 || @ Yankees || 3–2 || Francisco (2–2) || Rivera (2–3) || Wilson (19) || 53,223 || 44–41
|- align="center" bgcolor="ffbbbb"
| 86 || July 2 || @ Yankees ||  18–7 ||  Ramírez (2–0)||  Madrigal (0–1)||  || 52,659 || 44–42
|- align="center" bgcolor="ffbbbb"
| 87 || July 4 || @ Orioles || 10–4 || Guthrie (5–7) || Padilla (10–5) || || 21,363 || 44–43
|- align="center" bgcolor="bbffbb"
| 88 || July 5 || @ Orioles || 5–3 || Feldman (3–3) || Cormier (1–3) || Wilson (20)  || 19,006 || 45–43
|- align="center" bgcolor="bbffbb"
| 89 || July 6 || @ Orioles || 11–10 || Millwood (6–4) || Liz (3–1) || Wilson (21) || 22,276 || 46–43
|- align="center" bgcolor="ffbbbb"
| 90 || July 7 || Angels || 9–6 ||Santana (10–3) || Mendoza (1–3) || Rodríguez (35) || 21,170 || 46–44
|- align="center" bgcolor="bbffbb"
| 91 || July 8 || Angels || 3–2 ||Harrison (1–0) || Saunders (12–5) || Wilson (22) || 18,788 || 47–44
|- align="center" bgcolor="bbffbb"
| 92 || July 9 || Angels || 5–4 ||Wright (5–3) || Rodríguez (0–2) || || 24,515 || 48–44
|- align="center" bgcolor="ffbbbb"
| 93 || July 10 || Angels || 11 – 10 (11) || Speier (1–4) || Wright (5–4) ||  Rodríguez (36) || 23,262 || 48–45
|- align="center" bgcolor="bbffbb"
| 94 || July 11 || White Sox || 7–2 || Mendoza (2–3) || Floyd (10–5) || Guardado (2) || 28,003 || 49–45
|- align="center" bgcolor="ffbbbb"
| 95 || July 12 || White Sox || 9–7 || Danks (7–4) || Millwood (6–5) || || 39,209 || 49–46
|- align="center" bgcolor="bbffbb"
| 96 || July 13 || White Sox || 12–11 || Wright (6–4) || Logan (2–2) || || 28,459 || 50–46
|- align="center" bgcolor="ffbbbb"
| 97 || July 18 || @ Twins || 6–0 || Perkins (7–2) || Millwood (6–6) || || 30,134 || 50–47
|- align="center" bgcolor="ffbbbb"
| 98 || July 19 || @ Twins || 14–2 || Hernández (9–6) || Harrison (1–1) || || 35,085 || 50–48
|- align="center" bgcolor="bbffbb"
| 99 || July 20 || @ Twins || 1–0 || Padilla (11–5) || Baker (6–3) || Wilson (22) || 36,029 || 51–48
|- align="center" bgcolor="bbffbb"
| 100 || July 21 || @ White Sox || 6–1 || Feldman (4–3) || Vázquez (7–8) || || 39,547 || 52–48
|- align="center" bgcolor="ffbbbb"
| 101 || July 22 || @ White Sox || 10–2 || Buehrle (8–8) || Mendoza (2–4) || || 32,670 || 52–49
|- align="center" bgcolor="ffbbbb"
| 102 || July 23 || @ White Sox || 10–8 || Dotel (4–4) || Guardado (1–2) || Jenks (19) || 35,353 || 52–50
|- align="center" bgcolor="bbffbb"
| 103 || July 25 || @ Athletics || 14–6 || Padilla (12–5) || Blevins (0–1) || || 20,141 || 53–50
|- align="center" bgcolor="bbffbb"
| 104 || July 26 || @ Athletics || 9–4 || Harrison (2–1) || Duchscherer (10–7) || || 20,653 || 54–50
|- align="center" bgcolor="ffbbbb"
| 105 || July 27 || @ Athletics || 6–5 || Blevins (1–1) || Hurley (1–2) || Street (18) || 21,135 || 54–51
|- align="center" bgcolor="ffbbbb"
| 106 || July 28 || Mariners || 7–5 || Green (3–3) || Francisco (2–3) || Morrow (10) || 21,742 || 54–52
|- align="center" bgcolor="bbffbb"
| 107 || July 29 || Mariners || 11–10 || Wilson (1–2) || Putz (2–4) || || 17,618 || 55–52
|- align="center" bgcolor="bbffbb"
| 108 || July 30 || Mariners || 4–3 || Guardado (2–2) || Rhodes (2–1) || Wilson (24) || 23,894 || 56–52
|- align="center" bgcolor="ffbbbb"
| 109 || July 31 || Mariners || 8–5 || Dickey (3–6) || Harrison (2–2) || || 17,839 || 56–53
|-

|- align="center" bgcolor="bbffbb"
| 110 || August 1 || Blue Jays || 9–8 || Wilson (2–2) || Ryan (2–4) || || 23,973 || 57–53
|- align="center" bgcolor="ffbbbb"
| 111 || August 2 || Blue Jays || 6–4 || Burnett (13–9) || Feldman (4–4) || Ryan (21) || 32,641 || 57–54
|- align="center" bgcolor="bbffbb"
| 112 || August 3 || Blue Jays || 8–4 || Mendoza (3–4) || Purcey (1–2) || || 17,488 || 58–54
|- align="center" bgcolor="bbffbb"
| 113 || August 4 || Yankees || 9–5 || Guardado (3–2) || Marte (4–1) || || 33,813 || 59–54
|- align="center" bgcolor="bbffbb"
| 114 || August 5 || Yankees || 8–6 || Harrison (3–2) || Pettitte (12–9) || Guardado (3) || 34,473 || 60–54
|- align="center" bgcolor="ffbbbb"
| 115 || August 6 || Yankees || 5–3 || Ponson (7–2) || Hunter (0–1) || Rivera (27)  || 38,638 || 60–55
|- align="center" bgcolor="ffbbbb"
| 116 || August 7 || Yankees || 3–0 || Mussina (15–7) || Feldman (4–5) || Rivera (28) || 44,603 || 60–56
|- align="center" bgcolor="ffbbbb"
| 117 || August 8 || @ Orioles || 9–1 || Guthrie (9–8) || Mendoza (3–5) || || 33,351 || 60–57
|- align="center" bgcolor="ffbbbb"
| 118 || August 9 || @ Orioles || 9–0 || Cabrera (8–7) || Padilla (12–6) || || 30,914 || 60–58
|- align="center" bgcolor="bbffbb"
| 119 || August 10 || @ Orioles || 15–7 || Harrison (4–2) || Bierd (0–2) || || 26,878 || 61–58
|- align="center" bgcolor="ffbbbb"
| 120 || August 12 || @ Red Sox || 19–17 || Okajima (3–2) || Francisco (2–4) || Papelbon (32) || 38,004 || 61–59
|- align="center" bgcolor="ffbbbb"
| 121 || August 13 || @ Red Sox || 8–4 || Lester (11–4) || Mendoza (3–6) || || 37,876 || 61–60
|- align="center" bgcolor="ffbbbb"
| 122 || August 14 || @ Red Sox || 9–3 || Matsuzaka (14–2) || Hunter (0–2) || || 37,856 || 61–61
|- align="center" bgcolor="ffbbbb"
| 123 || August 15 || Rays || 7–0 || Garza (10–7) || Millwood (6–7) ||  || 20,233 || 61–62
|- align="center" bgcolor="bbffbb"
| 124 || August 16 || Rays || 3–0 || Harrison (5–2) || Jackson (9–8) || Guardado (4) || 29,238 || 62–62
|- align="center" bgcolor="ffbbbb"
| 125 || August 17 || Rays || 7–4 || Kazmir (9–6) || Nippert (1–3) || Wheeler (5) || 18,363 || 62–63
|- align="center" bgcolor="ffbbbb"
| 126 || August 18 || Tigers || 8–7 || Rogers (9–10) || Francisco (2–5) || Rodney (5) || 17,786 || 62-64
|- align="center" bgcolor="ffbbbb"
| 127 || August 19 || Tigers || 11–3 || Galarraga (12–4) || Padilla (12–7) || || 18,470 || 62-65
|- align="center" bgcolor="bbffbb"
| 128 || August 20 || Tigers || 9–1 || Millwood (7–7) || Robertson (7-10) || || 19,403 || 63-65
|- align="center" bgcolor="ffbbbb"
| 129 || August 22 || Indians || 7–5 || Carmona (6–5) || Harrison (5–3) || Lewis (5) || 20,535 || 63-66
|- align="center" bgcolor="ffbbbb"
| 130 || August 23 || Indians || 8–7 || Perez (3–3) || Wright (6–5) || Lewis (6) || 29,900 || 63-67
|- align="center" bgcolor="ffbbbb"
| 131 || August 24 || Indians || 4–3 || Betancourt (3–4) || Guardado (3–3) || || 14,956 || 63-68
|- align="center" bgcolor="bbffbb"
| 132 || August 25 || @ Royals || 9-4 || Feldman (5-5) || Meche (10-10) || || 12,399 || 64-68
|- align="center" bgcolor="bbffbb"
| 133 || August 26 || @ Royals || 2-1 || Millwood (8-7) || R. Ramírez (2-2) || || 17,004 || 65-68
|- align="center" bgcolor="bbffbb"
| 134 || August 27 || @ Royals || 3-2 || Harrison (6-3) || Bannister (7-14) || Francisco (1) || 12,662 || 66-68
|- align="center" bgcolor="ffbbbb"
| 135 || August 28 || @ Angels || 7–5 || Garland (12–8) || Wright (6-6) || Rodríguez (51) || 37,541 || 66-69
|- align="center" bgcolor="ffbbbb"
| 136 || August 29 || @ Angels || 3–1 || Santana (14–5) || Nippert (1–4) || Rodríguez (52) || 40,084 || 66-70
|- align="center" bgcolor="ffbbbb"
| 137 || August 30 || @ Angels || 4–3 || Arredondo (7–1) || Feldman (5–6) || Rodríguez (53) || 43,937 || 66-71
|- align="center" bgcolor="bbffbb"
| 138 || August 31 || @ Angels || 4–3 || Millwood (9–7) || Lackey (11–3) || Francisco (2) || 39,153 || 67-71
|-

|- align="center" bgcolor="ffbbbb"
| 139 || September 1 || Mariners || 12–6 || Green (4-4) || Mendoza (3-7) || || 16,171 || 67-72
|- align="center" bgcolor="bbffbb"
| 140 || September 2 || Mariners || 6–4 || McCarthy (1-0) || Feierabend (0-2) || Francisco (3) || 14,521 || 68-72
|- align="center" bgcolor="bbffbb"
| 141 || September 3 || Mariners || 1–0 || Nippert (2-4) || Hernández (9-9) || Francisco (4) || 12,882 || 69-72
|- align="center" bgcolor="ffbbbb"
| 142 || September 5 || Red Sox || 8–1 || Beckett (12–9) || Millwood (9–8) || || 30,264 || 69-73
|- align="center" bgcolor="bbffbb"
| 143 || September 6 || Red Sox || 15–8 || Harrison (7–3) || Wakefield (8–10) || || 38,208 || 70-73
|- align="center" bgcolor="ffbbbb"
| 144 || September 7 || Red Sox || 7–2 || Byrd (11–11) || McCarthy (1–1) || || 28,644 || 70-74
|- align="center" bgcolor="bbffbb"
| 145 || September 9 || @ Mariners || 7–3 || Padilla (13-7) || Hernández (9-10) || Madrigal (1) || 22,704 || 71-74
|- align="center" bgcolor="ffbbbb"
| 146 || September 10 || @ Mariners || 8-7 || Corcoran (5-0) || Millwood (9-9) || Putz (13) || 23,644 || 71-75
|- align="center" bgcolor="bbffbb"
| 147 || September 11 || @ Athletics || 6–1 || Nippert (3–4) || Braden (5–4) || || 10,566 || 72-75
|- align="center" bgcolor="bbffbb"
| 148 || September 12 || @ Athletics || 7–0 || Harrison (8–3) || Smith (7–15) || || 15,117 || 73-75
|- align="center" bgcolor="ffbbbb"
| 149 || September 13 || @ Athletics || 7–1 || Outman (1–0) || Feldman (5–7) || || 21,102 || 73-76
|- align="center" bgcolor="ffbbbb"
| 150 || September 14 || @ Athletics || 7–4 || Devine (6–1) || Madrigal (0–2) || Ziegler (9) || 18,551 || 73-77
|- align="center" bgcolor="bbffbb"
| 151 || September 15 || Tigers ||  11–8 || Francisco (3–5) || Farnsworth (2–3) || || 13,536 || 74-77
|- align="center" bgcolor="bbffbb"
| 152 || September 16 || Tigers || 5–4 || Wright (7-6) || Rodney (0–6) || || 14,659 || 75-77
|- align="center" bgcolor="ffbbbb"
| 153 || September 17 || Tigers || 17–4 || García (1-0) || Nippert (3–5) || || 17,808 || 75-78
|- align="center" bgcolor="ffbbbb"
| 154 || September 19 || Angels || 15–13 || Oliver (6–1) || Wright (7–7) || Shields (3) || 23,708 || 75-79
|- align="center" bgcolor="ffbbbb"
| 155 || September 20 || Angels || 7–3 || Speier (2–8) || Padilla (13–8) || Rodríguez (60) || 38,973 || 75-80
|- align="center" bgcolor="ffbbbb"
| 156 || September 21 || Angels ||  7–3 || Lackey (12–4) || Feldman (5–8) || || 28,390 || 75-81
|- align="center" bgcolor="ffbbbb"
| 157 || September 22 || Athletics || 4–3 (11) || Embree (2–4) || Mendoza (3–8) || Casilla (2) || 14,925 || 75-82
|- align="center" bgcolor="bbffbb"
| 158 || September 23 || Athletics || 6–4 || Wright (8–7) || Embree (2–5) || Francisco (5) || 18,408 || 76-82
|- align="center" bgcolor="bbffbb"
| 159 || September 24 || Athletics || 14–4 || Harrison (9–3) || Eveland (9–9) || || 16,832 || 77-82
|- align="center" bgcolor="bbffbb"
| 160 || September 26 || @ Angels || 12–1 || Padilla (14–8) || Lackey (12–5) || || 43,758 || 78-82
|- align="center" bgcolor="bbffbb"
| 161 || September 27 || @ Angels || 8–4 || Feldman (6–8) || Santana (16–7) || || 43,141 || 79-82
|- align="center" bgcolor="ffbbbb"
| 162 || September 28 || @ Angels || 7–0 || Saunders (17–7) || Millwood (9–10) || || 43,761 || 79-83
|-

Roster

Player stats

Batting

Starters by position
Note: Pos = Position; G = Games played; AB = At bats; H = Hits; Avg. = Batting average; HR = Home runs; RBI = Runs batted in

Other batters
Note: G = Games played; AB = At bats; H = Hits; Avg. = Batting average; HR = Home runs; RBI = Runs batted in

Pitching

Starting pitchers
Note: G = Games pitched; IP = Innings pitched; W = Wins; L = Losses; ERA = Earned run average; SO = Strikeouts

Other pitchers
Note: G = Games pitched; IP = Innings pitched; W = Wins; L = Losses; ERA = Earned run average; SO = Strikeouts

Relief pitchers
Note: G = Games pitched; W = Wins; L = Losses; SV = Saves; ERA = Earned run average; SO = Strikeouts

Farm system

LEAGUE CHAMPIONS: Spokane

References

2008 Texas Rangers season at Baseball Reference

Texas Rangers seasons
Texas Rangers
Range